Shenley Academy (formerly known as Shenley Court Specialist Arts College) is a mixed secondary school and sixth form located in the Weoley Castle area of southwest Birmingham. It first opened on 4 September 2009. The school's academy sponsor is E-ACT, a non-profit education foundation.

In October 2018 the school received an Ofsted inspection stating every area of the Academy was inadequate. With the results of this inspection the Academy was placed into special measures with a ‘notice to terminate’ letter delivered to E-ACT stating if actions were not taken to remove these special measures,  E-ACT would lose its sponsorship of Shenley Academy and Shenley would be transferred to a new Academy Trust. However in July 2021, Shenley had its first section 5 inspection since 2018. This report stated the school was now overall a ‘good’ school along with 3 out of the 4  areas inspected  named outstanding.

Shenley Academy (formerly known as Shenley Court School) is located in Weoley Castle, Birmingham.

Shenley became an Academy in 2009, with many changes occurring in and around the school. One of these was its uniform; the blue and yellow that had been used previously, for over 40 years, was replaced by black and red uniform, accompanied by matching sports wear. The change to an academy also brought a large sum of money to the school, this ended up being used to construct a new £24 million building for the academy. The new building opened on 10 September 2012 following a 19-month build programme led by main contractor Lend Lease Construction (EMEA) Limited, formerly known as Bovis Lend Lease.

The sixth form provision was offered as part of Oaks Sixth Form College, a consortium of 7 secondary schools in South-West Birmingham.

References

https://web.archive.org/web/20110722145723/https://gateway01.lpplus.net/schools/ShenleyAcademy/website/Pages/Home.aspx/

External links

Secondary schools in Birmingham, West Midlands
E-ACT
Academies in Birmingham, West Midlands
Educational institutions established in 2009
2009 establishments in England